Greenbaum is a surname. Notable people with the surname include:

 Andrew Britt Greenbaum
 Daniel "Dan" Robert Greenbaum (born 1969), American volleyball player
 Dorothea Greenbaum (1893–1986), American painter and sculptor
 Gus Greenbaum, American gangster
 Harrison Greenbaum (born 1986), American stand-up comedian and comedy writer
 Hyam Greenbaum (1901–1942), English conductor, violinist and composer
 Joanne Greenbaum (born 1953), American artist
 Jules Greenbaum, German film producer
 Mutz Greenbaum, German British cinematographer
 Norman Greenbaum, American singer-songwriter
 Sidney Greenbaum (1929–1996), British scholar of the English language and linguistics
 Yitzhak Greenbaum

Fictional characters 
Big Rosie Greenbaum from Laverne & Shirley

Greenebaum 
 Elliot Greenebaum (born 1977), an American film writer and director
 Hannah Greenebaum Solomon (1858, Chicago, Illinois -  1942, Chicago)
Henry Greenebaum (1833–1914), Jewish-American banker
 University of Maryland Greenebaum Cancer Center, named after Marlene and Stewart Greenebaum Cancer Center

See also 
 
 Peter Green, born: Peter Greenbaum, founder of the band Fleetwood Mac
 Mick Green (born: Michael Greenbaum), British rock and roll guitarist
 Max Greene (born: Mutz Greenbaum), British cinematographer and film director
 Grünbaum

Jewish surnames
Yiddish-language surnames

de:Greenbaum